Gladys Alberta Bentley (August 12, 1907 – January 18, 1960) was an American blues singer, pianist, and entertainer during the Harlem Renaissance.

Her career skyrocketed when she appeared at Harry Hansberry's Clam House, a well-known gay speakeasy in New York in the 1920s, as a black, lesbian, cross-dressing performer. She headlined in the early 1930s at Harlem's Ubangi Club, where she was backed up by a chorus line of drag queens. She dressed in men's clothes (including a signature tail coat and top hat), played piano, and sang her own raunchy lyrics to popular tunes of the day in a deep, growling voice while flirting with women in the audience.

On the decline of the Harlem speakeasies with the repeal of Prohibition, she relocated to southern California, where she was billed as "America's Greatest Sepia Piano Player" and the "Brown Bomber of Sophisticated Songs". She was frequently harassed for wearing men's clothing. She tried to continue her musical career but did not achieve as much success as she had had in the past. Bentley was openly lesbian early in her career, but during the McCarthy Era she started wearing dresses and married, claiming to have been cured by taking female hormones.

Early life
Bentley was born August 12, 1907 in Philadelphia, Pennsylvania, the daughter of George L. Bentley, an American, and his wife, Mary Mote, a Trinidadian. In Bentley's Ebony article, she wrote about trouble in the home as she was growing up and the relationship between her and her mother. She was the eldest of four children in a low-income family living at 1012 W. Euclid Ave. in North Philadelphia and always felt unwanted or rejected because her mother desperately wanted her to have been born a boy: "When they told my mother she had given birth to a girl, she refused to touch me. She wouldn't even nurse me and my grandmother had to raise me for 6 months on a bottle before they could persuade my mother to take care of her own baby." She believed that growing up feeling rejected shaped her behavior; she never wanted a man to touch her, hated her brothers, wore boys' clothes, and had a crush on one of her female teachers in elementary school.

Clothing choices 
In an interview with Ebony magazine, Bentley stated that "It seems I was born different. At least, I always thought I was." From an early age, Bentley defied gender normative behaviors and femininity. She was larger in size and preferred to wear her brother's suits instead of dresses or blouses. As a result of her lack of gender conformity, she was teased by her classmates and often ostracized by her family and peers. Bentley recalled dreaming and being infatuated with her primary school female teachers but did not understand those feelings until later on in her life. Bentley's behavior was seen as abnormal and "unladylike" which led to her family sending her to doctors to fix Bentley's desires. Later psychiatrists would coin Bentley's non-heteronormative behavior as "extreme social maladjustment." Due to her inability to feel conformable and her family's inability to accept her as she was, Bentley ran away from home at the age of 16 to begin her life in New York City.

Career
She moved from Philadelphia to Harlem, a neighborhood in New York City in 1925 at the age of 16. She heard that Harry Hansberry's Clam House on 133rd Street, one of the city's most notorious gay speakeasies, needed a male pianist.  This is when she began performing in men's attire ("white full dress shirts, stiff collars, small bow ties, oxfords, short Eton jackets, and hair cut straight back"), and here she perfected her act and became popular and successful. 
  
Her salary started at $35 per week plus tips and went to $125 per week, and the club was soon renamed Barbara's Exclusive Club, after her stage name at the time, Barbara "Bobbie" Minton. She then began performing at the Ubangi Club on Park Avenue, got an accompanist on piano, and was successful enough to own a "$300/month apartment in Park Ave. With servants and a nice car" (although some have said that she was living in the penthouse of one of her lesbian lovers). She toured the country, some destinations being Cleveland, Pittsburgh, Chicago, and Hollywood, where she was well liked by Cesar Romero, Hugh Herbert, Cary Grant, Barbara Stanwyck, and other celebrities.

Bentley had great talent as a piano player, singer, and entertainer. Her performances were "comical, sweet and risqué" for the era and the audience. In her music, she called out men and openly sang about sexual relationships which was seen as risqué behavior at the time. Even more, she often sang about "sissies" and "bulldaggers" and, through innuendo or more literally, about her female lovers, and she flirted with women in the audience. She mostly played the blues and parodies of popular songs of the time: "mocking 'high' class imagery with 'low' class humor, she applied aspects of the sexually charged 'black' blues to demure, romantic 'white' ballads, creating a culture clash between these two music forms". Bentley was known for taking popular songs and putting a promiscuous spin on them.

She sang loud, and her vocal style was deep and booming, sometimes using a growling effect and imitations of a horn. In August 1928, she signed with Okeh Records company and recorded eight sides over the course of the next year up until 1929. In 1930 she recorded a side with the Washboard Serenaders for Victor, and later recorded for the Excelsior, and Flame labels. Her vocal range was wide, as can be heard in her recordings. She mostly sang in a deep, low range, but also reached high notes. Bentley's performances appealed to black, white, gay, and straight audiences alike, and many celebrities attended her shows. Langston Hughes recorded his reaction to the beginning of Bentley's career success:

For two or three amazing years, Miss Bentley sat, and played piano all night long … with scarcely a break between the notes, sliding from one song to another, with a powerful and continuous underbeat of jungle rhythm. Miss Bentley was an amazing exhibition of musical energy – a large, dark, masculine lady, whose feet pounded the floor while her fingers pounded the keyboard – a perfect piece of African sculpture, animated by her own rhythm.

On the decline of the Harlem speakeasies with the repeal of Prohibition, she relocated to southern California, where she was billed as "America's Greatest Sepia Piano Player" and the "Brown Bomber of Sophisticated Songs". She tried to continue her musical career by playing in a number of gay nightspots but did not achieve as much success as she had had in the past. As times progressed and federal laws continued to change, there became a point where Bentley had to carry special permits to allow her to perform in men's clothing. She was frequently harassed for wearing men's clothing. She claimed that she had married a white woman in Atlantic City.   Bentley was openly lesbian early in her career, but during the McCarthy Era, she started wearing dresses and married (within five months of meeting) Charles Roberts, age 28, a cook, in a civil ceremony in Santa Barbara, California, in 1952. Roberts later denied that they had ever married.

On May 15, 1958 she appeared as a contestant on You Bet Your Life, engaging in discussion with host Groucho Marx before accompanying herself on piano as she sang "Them There Eyes".

Bentley also studied to be a minister, claiming to have been "cured" by taking female hormones. In an effort to describe her supposed "cure" for homosexuality she wrote an essay, "I Am a Woman Again", for Ebony magazine in which she stated she had undergone an operation, which "helped change her life again".

Legal battle 

In 1933, Bentley found herself in the middle of a Supreme Court battle with Harry Hansberry and Nat Palein. Hansberry and Palein sued Bentley to prohibit her from taking her musical to the Broadway division. Hansberry insisted that the club had been built around the popularity of Bentley's success and that he owned a five-year contract over Bentley and her raunchy songs. The duo insisted that Bentley left them high and dry at the rise of the club and wanted to pursue other interests that she could financially benefit from.

The same year, she attempted to move her act to Broadway, despite legal issues. There she received many complaints about her raunchy performances which resulted in the police locking up the doors of places she performed. Unable to express her talent on Broadway, she was forced to move back to Harlem in 1934, where she then played at the Ubangi Club for three years before it closed in 1937.

Personal life and death
In 1930, Bentley lived with a woman named Beatrice Robert. In 1931, Bentley had a civil ceremony in New Jersey, in a public union with a white woman whose identity is unknown. When Bentley relocated to Los Angeles, she allegedly married J. T. Gibson, who died in 1952, the same year in which she married Charles Roberts, a cook in Los Angeles; they were married in Santa Barbara, California, went on a honeymoon in Mexico. Gibson denied ever marrying her.

Bentley died of pneumonia unexpectedly at her home in Los Angeles on January 18, 1960, aged 52. It was initially believed to be the "Asian flu" but later turned into "pneumonia". At the time of her death, she had been more involved in the church and had just been ordained as a minister despite never getting her official paperwork. She is buried beside her mother at Lincoln Memorial Park in Carson, California.

Legacy
Aside from her musical talent and success, Bentley is a significant and inspiring figure for some in the LGBT community and African Americans, and she was a prominent figure during the Harlem Renaissance. She was revolutionary in her masculinity: "Differing from the traditional male impersonator, or drag king, in the popular theater, Gladys Bentley did not try to 'pass' as a man, nor did she playfully try to deceive her audience into believing she was biologically male. Instead, she exerted a 'black female masculinity' that troubled the distinctions between black and white and masculine and feminine".

Fictional characters based on Bentley appeared in Carl Van Vechten's novel Parties, Clement Woods' novel Deep River, and Blair Niles' novel Strange Brother.

In 2016, musician Shirlette Ammons released an album entitled Twilight for Gladys Bentley, that paid tribute to Bentley's legacy and "reimagined" Bentley in relationship to hip hop culture.

In 2019, The New York Times newspaper began a series called "Overlooked No More," in which the editorial staff aims to correct a perceived bias in reporting by republishing obituaries for historical minorities and women. Bentley was one of the featured obituaries in Overlooked No More.

Venues
Bentley appeared at:
 The Mad House, 133rd Street, Harlem, New York City, New York
 Harry Hansberry's Clam House ("Gladys' Clam House"), 133rd Street, Harlem, Harlem, New York City, New York
 Ubangi Club, Harlem, New York City, New York
 Connie's Inn ("Jungle Alley"), 2221 Seventh Street, Harlem, New York City, New York
Apollo Theatre, Harlem, New York City, New York
 The Cotton Club, Harlem, New York City, New York
 Joaquin's El Rancho, Los Angeles, California
Mona's 440 Club, North Beach, San Francisco, California

Discography
Okeh Records

Recorded August 8 and 31, 1928
"Worried Blues" / "Ground Hog Blues" (August 1928) #8610
"How Long, How Long Blues" / "Moanful Wailin' Blues" (August 1928) #8612
Recorded November 15, 1928, and March 26, 1929
"Wild Geese Blues" / "How Much Can I Stand" (November 1928, with piano, not released)
"Wild Geese Blues" / "How Much Can I Stand" (November 1928, with guitar) #8643
"Red Beans and Rice" / "Big Gorilla Man" (March 1929) #8707

Victor
"Washboards Get Together" / "Kazoo Moan", #38127, scatting vocal on A-side only (title often listed as "Washboard Get Together"), with the Washboard Serenaders, recorded March 1930; reissued twice, as Bluebird B-5790 (circa 1934) and B-6633 (circa 1936)

Excelsior Records

As Gladys Bentley Quintette, 1945
"Boogie'n My Woogie" / "Thrill Me Till I Get My Fill", #164
"Red Beans & Rice Blues" / "Find Out What He Likes (and How He Likes It)" #165/166
"Big Gorilla Blues" / "Lay It on the Line", #166/165
"Boogie Woogie Cue" / "Give It Up", #168
"Notoriety Papa" / "It Went to the Girl Next Door", #169

Swingtime Records
"Jingle Jangle Jump", #321, vocals for Wardell Gray and the Dexter Gordon Quintet, 1952
"July Boogie" / "Gladys Could Play", #337, as Fatso Bentley, July 4, 1953

Flame Records
"Easter Mardi Gras" / "Before Midnight", Flame 1001, Cincinnati, early 1950s, label misspells name as Gladys Bently; mentioned in her August 1952 article in Ebony and thus recorded in 1952 or earlier

References

External links

Collection of newspaper clippings and recording information about Gladys Bentley, from Queer Music Heritage by JD Doyle
.

1907 births
1960 deaths
20th-century African-American women singers
American blues singers
Deaths from pneumonia in California
American drag kings
LGBT African Americans
American lesbian musicians
Bisexual women
Musicians from Philadelphia
Singers from New York City
People from Harlem
Harlem Renaissance
20th-century American singers
Singers from Pennsylvania
LGBT people from Pennsylvania
American LGBT singers
Infectious disease deaths in California
20th-century American women musicians
20th-century American musicians
20th-century American women singers
20th-century American LGBT people